Solidago erecta is a species of goldenrod known by the common names showy goldenrod and slender goldenrod. It is native to the eastern United States, from Massachusetts west to Indiana, and south as far as Georgia and Mississippi.

Solidago erecta is a  perennial herb up to 120 cm (4 feet) tall. One plant can produce as many as 350 small yellow flower heads in an elongated array.

References

External links

erecta
Flora of the Eastern United States
Plants described in 1813